Ludwig Wilding (19 May 1927 – 4 January 2010) was a German artist whose work is associated with Op art and Kinetic art.  Wilding was born in Grünstadt, Germany.  He studied at the University of Mainz Art School.

Wilding's works are three-dimensional structures that create shifting patterns through their black and white designs.  He has shown at the Museum Leverkusen (1953), Zimmergallery, Frankfurt (1958) and Studio F, Ulm (1965). His work was included in The Responsive Eye (Museum of Modern Art, New York, 1965), Eyes, Lies, and Illusions (Hayward Gallery, London, 2004) and Optic Nerve: Perceptual Art of the 1960s (The Columbus Museum of Art, Ohio, 2007). Ludwig Wilding lived in Westheim, Germany.

References

The Responsive Eye. William C. Seitz, New York: The Museum of Modern Art, 1965.

Ludwig Wilding. Retrospektive 1949-1987 Kaiserslautern: Pfalzgalerie des Bezirksverbands Pfalz, 1987.

Ludwig Wilding. Una traiettoria cinetica. Getulio Alviani, Milano: Edizioni Arte Struktura, 2004.

Ludwig Wilding. Visuelle Phanomen. Wienand Verlag Edizioni, 2007.

Ludwig Wilding. kunst= traum = illusion = tauschung. Hamburg: Galerie Renate Kammer, 2012.

Ludwig Wilding. Kinetische und Programmierte Kunst: 1967/2008. Milano: Galleria Dep Art Edizioni, 2013.

External links 
 Galerie La Ligne, Zürich - biography and information about his stereoscopic art

1927 births
2010 deaths
Johannes Gutenberg University Mainz alumni
20th-century German painters
20th-century male artists
German male painters
21st-century German painters
21st-century male artists
German contemporary artists
Op art